Mattie Clarke (1922 – 6 January 1960) was a footballer.

Born in Dublin, Clarke was a product of Drumcondra F.C. He played for his country at youth level against England in 1938. Shortly after he joined Shamrock Rovers where he spent 12 seasons as a defender. However, he joined Rovers as a striker and scored a hat-trick in one of his first games for the club. He played nine times for the League of Ireland XI while at Glenmalure Park.

He won his one and only senior cap for Ireland on 10 May 1950 in a 5–1 defeat to Belgium in Brussels.

In the 1950–51 season Clarke was awarded a testimonial for his twelve years service at Milltown. He then moved to Dundalk F.C. He signed for Waterford United in August 1954 .

His son Jackie played for the Hoops in the 1970s.

Honours
Shamrock Rovers
 League of Ireland: 1938–39
 FAI Cup: 1939–40, 1943–44, 1944–45, 1947–48

Dundalk
 FAI Cup: 1952

Sources 
 The Hoops by Paul Doolan and Robert Goggins

https://www.dundalkfcwhoswho.com/player.php?id=119

1922 births
1960 deaths
Association footballers from County Dublin
Republic of Ireland association footballers
Association football defenders
Association football forwards
Republic of Ireland international footballers
Ireland (FAI) international footballers
Shamrock Rovers F.C. players
Dundalk F.C. players
Waterford F.C. players
League of Ireland players
League of Ireland XI players
Drumcondra F.C. players